The 1998 Regal Scottish Masters was a professional non-ranking snooker tournament that took place between 29 September and 4 October 1998 at the Motherwell Civic Centre in Motherwell, Scotland.

Prize Fund
The breakdown of prize money for this year is shown below:
Winner: £61,000
Runner-up: £29,700
Semi-final: £15,350
Quarter-final: £8,650
Round 1: £4,850
Total: £175,400

Main draw

Preliminary qualifying
The preliminary qualifying rounds for the tournament were for four highest-ranked Scottish players who were not invited to the main event and took place on 9 September 1998 at the Spencer's Snooker Centre in Stirling. Jamie Burnett won the four-man playoff and earned the final spot for the main qualifying event. All matches were played to the best-of-nine frames and players in bold indicate match winners.

Qualifying Event
Qualifying for the tournament took place at the Spencer's Snooker Centre in Stirling from 10 to 12 September 1998. Paul Hunter defeated Matthew Stevens, Stephen Lee and Jamie Burnett to secure a place at the main draw. All matches were played to the best-of-nine frames and players in bold indicate match winners.

Century breaks

 132  Jimmy White
 129, 122  Stephen Hendry
 113, 107  John Higgins
 113  Mark Williams
 100  Paul Hunter

References

Scottish Masters
Masters
Scottish Masters
Scottish Masters
Scottish Masters